Illinois Route 149 is an east–west state road in southern Illinois. It runs from Illinois Route 3 near Grimsby east to Illinois Route 34 in Thompsonville.

Route description 
Illinois 149 runs east–west through downtown Murphysboro and to the north of Carbondale. It also runs to the north of Herrin. West of Carbondale, Illinois 149 overlaps Illinois Routes 13 and 127.  Through  West Frankfort, Illinois 149 doubles as "Main Street."

History 
SBI Route 149 originally ran from Hurst to Thompsonville.

Major intersections

References

External links

149
Transportation in Jackson County, Illinois
Transportation in Williamson County, Illinois
Transportation in Franklin County, Illinois